CVS Health Corporation (previously CVS Corporation and CVS Caremark Corporation) is an American healthcare company that owns CVS Pharmacy, a retail pharmacy chain; CVS Caremark, a pharmacy benefits manager; and Aetna, a health insurance provider, among many other brands. The company is the world's largest healthcare company, and its headquarters are in Woonsocket, Rhode Island.

History of CVS 
Consumer Value Stores (CVS) was founded in 1963 by three partners: brothers Stanley and Sidney Goldstein and Ralph Hoagland, who grew the venture from a parent company, Mark Steven, Inc., that helped retailers manage their health and beauty aid product lines. The business began as a chain of health and beauty aid stores, but within several years, pharmacies were added. To expand, the company joined the Melville Corporation, which managed a string of retail businesses. In December 2017, CVS agreed to acquire Aetna for $69billion and completed the acquisition in November 2018. Legal issues related to the merger were resolved in September 2019. In February 2020, CVS Health announced changes to its board of directors, whose size was reduced from 16 to 13 directors.

In 2021, CVS Health was ranked 4th on the Fortune 500 list, and 7th on the Fortune Global 500 list.

On November 18, 2021, CVS Health announced that the company plans to close 900 stores over the next three years with closing due to begin in the spring of 2022.

In November 2021, a federal jury found that CVS, along with Walgreens and Walmart, "had substantially contributed to" the opioid crisis.

Company name
CVS, begun in Lowell, Massachusetts, by brothers Stanley and Sidney Goldstein and their partner Ralph Hoagland, later had to sell to the Melville Corporation, formerly based in Rye, New York. The name stood for Consumer Value Stores.

Caremark was established by James M. Sweeney in 1979, as Home Health Care of America (HHCA), incorporated in Delaware, with corporate headquarters in Irvine, California. The first office was opened in Beachwood, Ohio, with four employees, in conjunction with Ezra Steiger, of the Cleveland Clinic Foundation. Steiger's Hyperalimentation Team worked closely to provide supplies at home for their parenteral therapy patients.  Satellite offices were subsequently opened in Atlanta, Philadelphia, Houston, Chicago, and Irvine.  HHCA changed its name to Caremark in 1985. In 1987, Caremark was acquired by Baxter International. In 1991, when Caremark was Baxter International's home infusion subsidiary, Caremark was accused by the United States government of "paying doctors to steer patients to its intravenous drug service." Caremark was fined $160million for the "four-year-long federal mail-fraud and kickback" scheme in which the "home-infusion business unit made weekly payments to scores of doctors that averaged about $75 per patient for referring those patients to its services. Some doctors earned as much as $80,000 a year from the kickbacks, according to government documents." In 1992, Baxter spun off Caremark as a public company. Caremark sold its home infusion service and successfully branched out to four units, "a physician practice management unit, a prescription benefits management unit, a disease state management service aimed at treating high-cost, chronic diseases and an international division." In 1996, Caremark merged with Birmingham, Alabama-based MedPartners/Mullikin, Inc., the combined company being called MedPartners, Inc. In 1998, MedPartners changed its name to Caremark Rx.

On September 3, 2014, it was announced that CVS, as of midnight Tuesday September 2, 2014, would no longer sell tobacco products at all of its 7,700 locations nationwide, a month earlier than planned. It also announced it would change its corporate name to CVS Health to reflect "its broader health care commitment" and a desire to change the future health of Americans, although all retail stores would continue to be called "CVS/pharmacy", unless they did not contain a pharmacy, in which case they are just signed CVS.

History

1960s
The first Consumer Value Store (CVS), selling health and beauty products, was founded in 1963, in Lowell, Massachusetts, by brothers Stanley and Sidney Goldstein and Ralph Hoagland. By 1964, CVS had 17 stores that sold primarily beauty products. In 1967, CVS opened its first stores with pharmacy departments in Warwick, Rhode Island, and Cumberland, Rhode Island. CVS was sold to Melville Corporation in 1969.

1970s
By 1970, CVS was operating 100 stores in New England and the Northeast. In 1972, CVS acquired 84 Clinton Drug and Discount Stores. This purchase introduced CVS to the Midwest with stores in Indiana.

During 1977, CVS acquired 36 New Jersey–based Mack Drug stores.

1980s

 1983: Hemophilia patient home health care is launched.
 1988: CVS acquires Heartland Drug, a small pharmacy company in the Boston area giving it stores in the Boston metro including Watertown Square and Harvard Square.

1990s
 1990: CVS acquired 500 Peoples Drug stores, establishing the company in new mid-Atlantic markets including Washington, D.C., Pennsylvania, Maryland and Virginia.
 1994: CVS launched PharmaCare, a pharmacy benefit management (PBM) company.
 1996: CVS Corporation became a standalone company trading on the New York Stock Exchange under the "CVS" ticker. Stanley Goldstein was the company's first chairman.
 1997: CVS acquired over 2,500 Revco drug stores, establishing the company in additional Midwestern, Southeastern and Eastern states.
 1998: CVS acquired 207 stores from Arbor Drugs, giving CVS its first stores in Michigan.
 1999: CVS acquired Soma.com, the first online pharmacy, and renamed it CVS.com to become the first fully integrated online and brick-and-mortar pharmacy offering to consumers.

2000s
 2000: CVS acquired Stadtlander pharmacy from Bergen Brunswig Corporation, making CVS ProCare the largest specialty pharmacy in the U.S. at the time.
 2001: CVS/pharmacy launched the ExtraCare loyalty card program. Within a year, 30million customers enrolled to earn rewards and receive discounts.
 2004: CVS purchased 1,268 Eckerd drug stores and Eckerd Health Services, Eckerd's PBM/Mail-order pharmacy business, from JCPenney. The purchase expanded the company's footprint in Texas, Florida and other southern states.
 2006: CVS acquired 700 freestanding drug store operations of supermarket chain Albertsons, including stores trading under the Osco Drug and Sav-On Drugs banners.
 2006: CVS acquired Minneapolis-based MinuteClinic, as a wholly owned subsidiary of CVS Corporation.
 2007: CVS Corporation and Caremark Rx, Inc. complete their transformative merger, creating CVS Caremark, an integrated pharmacy services provider, and the corporate headquarters remained in Woonsocket, RI. Tom Ryan, the chairman and CEO of CVS remained president and CEO of CVS Caremark Corporation, while Caremark's Edwin Crawford became the chairman of the board.
 2008: CVS Caremark acquired 541 stores from Longs Drugs Stores Corp in California, Hawaii, and Nevada.

2010s

 2011: Larry Merlo succeeds Tom Ryan as president and CEO of CVS Caremark. Merlo joined CVS/pharmacy in 1990, through the acquisition of People's Drug.
 2014: CVS Caremark acquired Coram, the specialty infusion services and enteral nutrition business unit of Apria Healthcare Group Inc.
 2014: CVS Caremark announced it would stop selling cigarettes and tobacco products in all of its CVS/pharmacy stores.
 2014: CVS Caremark removed all cigarettes and tobacco products from its CVS/pharmacy stores and launched a national smoking cessation program. The company also changed its corporate name to CVS Health.
 2014: CVS Health acquired 33 Miami-based Navarro Discount Pharmacy stores, the largest Hispanic-owned drugstore chain the United States.
 2015: CVS Health acquired Omnicare, provider of pharmacy services to long-term care facilities.
 2015: CVS Health acquires Target Corporation's 1,600+ pharmacies and retail medical clinics inside Target stores. CVS has begun operating them through a store-within-a-store format.
 2017: CVS announced they would be installing 25 vending machines in high traffic areas like, bus terminals, airports, and college campuses. The first kiosks will be located in LaGuardia Airport and Boston's South Station Bus Terminal and will carry personal items such as toothpaste, deodorant, batteries, and healthy snack foods.
 2017: CVS announced they agreed to buy health insurer Aetna for roughly about $207 per share, broken down into $145 in cash and the rest in stock, in December 2017. If approved, it would allow CVS to provide a broad range of health services to Aetna's 22million medical members.
 December 5, 2017: The Wall Street Journal reported that there was still a $69billion deal pending between CVS and Aetna, so long as it received government approval. CVS CEO Larry Merlo had been named to run the combined company.
 2018: In November, CEO Larry Merlo told USA Today that the drugstore chain plans to renovate its stores to focus more on health care and less on retail following its merger with the health insurance company Aetna. The new strategy is to offer medical services along with prescription drugs, among other products.
 June 4, 2019: USA Today reported on the planned expansion of a CVS Health store concept called HealthHUB to 1,500 locations by the end of 2021. The concept, launched in the Houston area in early 2019, realigns CVS retail outlets with a stronger focus on health care services. HealthHUB stores dedicate at least 20% of their floor space to health care services such as yoga classes and enlarged Minute Clinic spaces to offer more health assessments. To accommodate HealthHUB, CVS locations will reduce the floor space currently devoted to slower-selling merchandise, such as greeting cards. The store conversions to the HealthHub format was paused in March 2020, due to the COVID-19 pandemic.

2020s
 On November 18, 2021, CVS Health announced that the company plans to close 900 stores nationwide over the next three years because of what executives described as changes in consumer shopping behavior, population, and the future of health care needs. The closures would represent approximately 10 percent of stores in the U.S.
 On December 2, 2021, CVS Health announced a strategic partnership with Microsoft to improve personalized care and digital health.

Acquisition of Aetna
On November 28, 2018, CVS Health completed the acquisition of Aetna.

On December 3, 2018, U.S. District Judge Richard J. Leon informed CVS Health Corp and the insurer Aetna that they have to keep their management separate until he weighs in on their $69billion merger. The judge gave CVS and Aetna until December 14, 2018, to explain why the companies should not hold off on their consolidation.

In September 2019, Judge Leon gave final approval to the merger. As a condition of the approval, Aetna had sold its Medicare prescription insurance plans to WellCare Health Plans.

Acquisition of Signify Health 
In September 2022, CVS Health announced that it reached an agreement to buy at-home health company Signify Health for roughly $8 billion. It came one month after it announced a plan to move into primary care by the end of the year.

Acquisition of Oak Street Health 
On February 8, 2023 CVS Health announced it has entered into a definitive agreement to acquire Oak Street Health in an all-cash transaction at $39 per share, representing an enterprise value of approximately $10.6 billion.

Finances

Subsidiaries and assets

CVS Pharmacy

CVS Pharmacy is one of the largest retail pharmacy chains in the United States, with 9,600 stores located in all 50 states, the District of Columbia, and Puerto Rico, operating primarily under the CVS Pharmacy, CVS, Longs Drugs, Navarro Discount Pharmacy and Drogaria Onofre names. CVS Pharmacy fills more than one of every five prescriptions in the United States, and 85% of U.S. population lives within 10 miles of a CVS Pharmacy. The ExtraCare loyalty program boasts over 70million cardholders, making it the largest retail loyalty program in the country.

MinuteClinic

MinuteClinic retail medical clinics operate inside CVS Pharmacy locations within the United States. It is the largest walk-in medical clinic in the United States, with over 1,100 locations in 33 states and the District of Columbia. More than 50 percent of the U.S. population now lives within 10 miles of a MinuteClinic.

CVS Caremark
CVS Caremark provides comprehensive prescription benefit management services including mail order pharmacy services, specialty pharmacy and infusion services, plan design and administration, formulary management and claims processing. The company's clients are primarily employers, insurance companies, unions, government employee groups, health plans, Managed Medicaid plans and other sponsors of health benefit plans and individuals throughout the United States. CVS Caremark manages the dispensing of prescription drugs for more than 75million plan members through five mail order pharmacies, specialty pharmacies, long-term care pharmacies and national network of more than 68,000 retail pharmacies, consisting of approximately 41,000 chain pharmacies and 27,000 independent pharmacies.

CVS Specialty
CVS Specialty is the specialty pharmacy division that provides specialty pharmacy services for individuals with chronic or genetic diseases who require complex and expensive drug therapies. CVS Health operate 24 retail specialty pharmacy stores and 11 specialty mail order pharmacies, making them the largest specialty pharmacy in the United States.

Longs Drugs
Longs Drugs is a retail pharmacy chain with approximately 40 drug stores throughout the state of Hawaii. The company was acquired by CVS Health in October 2008, and is operated as a separate brand.

Navarro Discount Pharmacies
Navarro Discount Pharmacies is a pharmacy chain, photo service, and pharmacy benefit manager in the United States. The company was acquired by CVS Health in September 2014, and is operated as a separate brand of CVS Health. The company mainly operates in Miami-Dade and Broward Counties and currently has 33 stores.

Accordant
Accordant provides rare disease case management and care management services for patients with rare, chronic diseases and their caregivers. Clients are primarily health plans, employers, and third party administrators (TPAs). The company is operated as a wholly owned subsidiary of CVS Health Corporation.

Coram
Coram is one of the nation's largest providers of infusion services, clinical and compliance monitoring and individual patient counseling and education. Coram cares for 140,000 patients annually through a national network of more than 85 locations as well as the largest home infusion network in the United States. The company was acquired by CVS Health in August 2015, and is operated as a wholly owned subsidiary of CVS Health Corporation.

Omnicare
Omnicare is a provider of pharmacy services to the long-term care market for patients in skilled nursing and assisted living facilities throughout North America. The company was acquired by CVS Health in August 2015, and is operated as a wholly owned subsidiary of CVS Health Corporation.

HealthHUB 
HealthHUBs operate inside of select CVS Pharmacy locations and offer a variety of additional services in addition to traditional CVS locations. HealthHUB locations offer and expanded variety of Sleep Apnea, Durable Medical Equipment, Home and Health technology, and compression therapy. HealthHUBs are staffed by Care Concierges who are experts in HealthHub products and services. In addition, MinuteClinic locations that are HealthHub stores have expanded services and hire Medical Assistants, Registered Nurses, and Licensed Practical and Vocational Nurses to help support the Nurse Practitioners and Physician Assistants.

Store brands and private label brands
CVS Health offers a number of over-the-counter private label brands in their retail pharmacy stores, including grocery brands Gold Emblem™ and Gold Emblem Abound™; household products under the Total Home name; preservative-free vitamins and supplements under the Radiance PLATINUM line; and beauty and skin products through the Beauty 360, Nuance Salma Hayek, Makeup Academy, Skin+Pharmacy, Blade and Essence of Beauty lines.

Community involvement and philanthropy
 The CVS Caremark Charitable Trust was established to provide funding for health care, education and community involvement initiatives in communities where CVS/pharmacy stores are located.
 Since 1978, CVS Samaritan Vans have provided free roadside assistance to motorists and the community in numerous cities. They are "emergency response vehicles" that patrol select major freeways of Chicago, Charlotte, Cincinnati, Cleveland, Boston, Detroit, Indianapolis, Providence and Washington, D.C., in search of motorists in need. The drivers have a multitude of talents and certifications. They are Nationally Certified Auto Mechanics, State Certified Emergency Medical Technicians (EMTs) or Paramedics, and Nationally Certified Animal Control Officers. They are capable of making numerous on-site auto repairs, administering medical help, calming a tense situation or using their communication equipment to summon the state police or other assistance.
 Played at the Rhode Island Country Club, the CVS Caremark Charity Classic was established to raise money for the support of non-profit agencies throughout New England. Since 1999, it has raised over $8million for charity. The event has featured golf legends such as Arnold Palmer, Jack Nicklaus, Hale Irwin, and Gary Player along with today's top stars like David Duval, Chris DiMarco, Davis Love III, & Scott McCarron.

Tobacco products removed from stores
On February 5, 2014, CVS announced that the company would discontinue the sale of all tobacco and cigarette products from their stores by October 1, 2014. In a statement explaining the change, CVS president and CEO Larry J. Merlo said, "We came to the decision that cigarettes and providing health care just don't go together in the same setting."

Criticism and controversy
On August 22, 2001, CVS Corp was sued for purchasing Trio Drugs' records which should be kept confidential.

Elensys
In 1998, The Washington Post reported that CVS Corporation appeared to be sharing prescription drug information with the Woburn, Massachusetts, based marketing company, Elensys. According to the Post, Elensys received information on specific prescription drugs that individual CVS customers had purchased and used this information to send targeted direct mailings urging customers to renew prescriptions and promoting other products in which they might be interested. CVS and Elensys argued that there were no privacy issues because Elensys was acting solely as a contractor to CVS, and because the purpose of the mailings was to educate consumers. CVS claimed that it never shared customers' medical histories with Elensys (despite The Washington Post's indirect evidence that they had). George D. Lundberg, editor of the Journal of the American Medical Association, called the practice "a gross invasion" of privacy. Following a firestorm of criticism and complaints by consumers, CVS discontinued the relationship with Elensys, and moved the practice in-house.

Boston prescriptions
During 2005, a series of prescription mistakes came to light in some of CVS Corporation's Boston-area stores. An investigation confirmed 62 errors or quality problems going back to 2002. In February 2006, the state Board of Pharmacy announced that the non-profit Institute for Safe Medication Practices (ISMP) would monitor all Massachusetts stores for the next two years.

Health and Medicare fraud
In the late 1980s and early 1990s Caremark RX was involved in a number of health fraud and Medicare fraud scandals.
The combined price to settle this dispute with the U.S. Government cost the company over $250million.

Pharmaceutical kickbacks
In 2005, Caremark Rx paid $137.5million to settle federal lawsuits filed by whistleblowers that accused a company it acquired in 2003, of improper dealings with pharmaceutical manufacturers.

The lawsuits said that the acquired company, AdvancePCS, accepted kickbacks from drug makers to promote their products over those of rivals under contracts with government programs including the Federal Employees Health Benefit Program, the Mail Handlers Health Benefit Program and Medicare health maintenance plans.

There was no admission of wrongdoing by Caremark or AdvancePCS.

CVS Caremark Corp. has changed their practices. The formulary revision process considers manufacturer rebates, payments from drug manufacturers for low placement on PBM (Pharmacy Benefit Manager) formularies, along with average wholesale price (AWP), drug availability, and bulk discounts when choosing at which co-pay a brand name drug should be placed.

Deceptive business practices
In February 2008, CVS settled a large civil lawsuit for deceptive business practices. The Kaiser Family Foundation reported:

CVS has agreed to a $38.5million settlement in a multi-state civil deceptive-practices lawsuit against pharmacy benefit manager Caremark filed by 28 attorneys general, the Chicago Tribune reports. The attorneys general, led by Lisa Madigan (D) of Illinois and Douglas Ganslar (D) of Maryland, allege that Caremark "engaged in deceptive business practices" by informing physicians that patients or health plans could save money if patients were switched to certain brand-name prescription drugs (Miller, Chicago Tribune, 2/14).

However, the switch often saved patients and health plans only small amounts or increased their costs, while increasing Caremark's profits, Connecticut Attorney General Richard Blumenthal (D) said (Levick, Hartford Courant, 2/15). Pennsylvania Attorney General Tom Corbett (R) said the Pharmacy Benefit Manager (PBM), kept discounts and rebates that should have been passed on to employers and patients (Levy, AP/San Francisco Chronicle, 2/14). In addition, Caremark did not "adequately inform doctors" of the full financial effect of the switch and did not disclose that the switch would increase Caremark's profits, the lawsuit alleges (Chicago Tribune, 2/14).

...The settlement prohibits CVS from requesting prescription drug switches in certain cases, such as when the cost to the patient would be higher with the new prescription drug; when the original prescription drug's patent will expire within six months; and when patients were switched from a similar prescription drug within the previous two years (Hartford Courant, 2/15). Patients also have the ability to decline a switch from the prescribed treatment to the prescription offered by the pharmacy under the settlement, Madigan said (Bloomberg News/The Philadelphia Inquirer, 2/15).

Rhode Island Senate corruption case
In 2008, two former CVS executives, John R. "Jack" Kramer and Carlos Ortiz, were charged with 20 counts of mail fraud, bribery and conspiracy in relation to Operation Dollar Bill, a probe of corruption in the Rhode Island General Assembly. Kramer and Ortiz hired former state senator John Celona, who currently is serving  years on corruption charges involving CVS and other companies, as a media consultant for $12,000 a year. Celona was known for walking out on a pharmacy choice vote in the state senate while on the CVS payroll. Despite originally claiming CVS never bought any favors in his own trial, he testified against Kramer and Ortiz as the prosecution's star witness. On May 31, 2008, Kramer and Ortiz were acquitted on all counts. One juror went on the record as saying "My perception living in Rhode Island all my life is, 'Yeah, this probably did go on', but I didn't see any proof beyond a reasonable doubt that CVS did this."

Business practices under investigation
On May 4, 2010, CVS Caremark Corp. announced that its business practices were being investigated by a group of 24 states, along with the District of Columbia and Los Angeles County. At issue is the post-merger relationship between CVS and Caremark. In addition, the company had earlier acknowledged in a filing with the Securities and Exchange Commission (SEC) that it had received a subpoena from the Office of Inspector General of the United States Department of Health and Human Services, requiring the company to provide information regarding the incentives the company provides to customers who transfer their prescriptions to CVS, including gift cards, goods and other incentives.

FTC charges of privacy violations
On February 18, 2009, CVS Caremark agreed to settle Federal Trade Commission charges that it failed to take reasonable and appropriate security measures to protect the sensitive financial and medical information of its customers and employees, in violation of federal law. In a separate but related agreement, the company's pharmacy chain also has agreed to pay $2.25million to resolve Department of Health and Human Services allegations that it violated the Health Insurance Portability and Accountability Act (HIPAA).

FTC charges of deceptive pricing
On January 12, 2012, CVS Caremark paid $5million to settle Federal Trade Commission charges that it misrepresented the prices of certain Medicare Part D prescription drugs – including drugs used to treat breast cancer symptoms and epilepsy – at CVS and Walgreens pharmacies.

DEA investigation into oxycodone diversion

According to the U.S. Justice Department, in 2011, CVS pharmacies in Sanford, Florida, ordered enough painkillers to supply a population eight times its size. Sanford has a population of 53,000 but the supply would support 400,000. According to the Drug Enforcement Administration, in 2010, a single CVS pharmacy in Sanford ordered 1.8million Oxycodone pills, an average of 137,994 pills a month. Other pharmacy customers in Florida averaged 5,364 oxycodone pills a month. DEA investigators serving a warrant to a CVS pharmacy in Sanford on October 18, 2011, noted that "approximately every third car that came through the drive-thru lane had prescriptions for oxycodone or hydrocodone". According to the DEA, a pharmacist at that location stated to investigators that "her customers often requested certain brands of oxycodone using street slang", an indicator that the drugs were being diverted and not used for legitimate pain management. In response, CVS in a statement issued February 17 in response to opioid trafficking questions from USA Today said the company is committed to working with the DEA and had taken "significant actions to ensure appropriate dispensing of painkillers in Florida".

Restatements
On November 15, 1999, CVS announced a restatement of its financial results for 1997, and 1998, following a Securities and Exchange Commission review of acquisition-related charges.

On February 25, 2005, CVS said it was reducing its previously announced fourth-quarter earnings by $40.5million, to reflect the way it accounted for leased properties in its results.

Co-responsibility for opioid crisis
In September 2016, Massachusetts Attorney General Maura Healey announced a $795,000 settlement where CVS agrees to check a state database before filling the prescription for addictive opioids and other controlled substances. The settlement resolves previous allegations that the drugstore chain failed to provide pharmacists with access to the state of Massachusetts Prescription Monitoring Program (PMP). In July 2020, the attorney general of the Commonwealth of Kentucky filed a lawsuit against CVS alleging that their business practices aided in the advancing of the opioid epidemic.

In November 2021, a federal jury in Cleveland found that pharmacies operated by CVS Health, Walgreens, and Walmart were liable for contributing to the opioid epidemic in two Ohio counties. The trial lasted six weeks with the jury returning a verdict finding the Ohio pharmacies liable. It was the first trial where pharmacy companies defended themselves amidst the opioid epidemic.

In August 2022, the company was one of three chains ordered to pay damages of $650 million by a Cleveland judge in a lawsuit over opioid sales brought on by Lake County and Trumbull County in Ohio. The other two chains were Walgreens and Walmart, with two others, Rite Aid and Giant Eagle, settling before going to trial. Lawyers representing the counties claimed damages of $3.3 billion.

CFI lawsuit for consumer fraud 
In July 2018, the Center for Inquiry filed a lawsuit against CVS for consumer fraud over its sale of homeopathic medicines. The filing in part contends that apart from being a waste of money, choosing homeopathic treatments to the exclusion of evidence-based medicines can result in worsened or prolonged symptoms, and in some cases, even death.

See also

 Express Scripts
 Rite Aid
 Walgreens

References

External links
 

 
2007 establishments in Rhode Island
American companies established in 2007
Companies based in Providence County, Rhode Island
Companies listed on the New York Stock Exchange
Health care companies based in Rhode Island
Health care companies established in 2007
Pharmacies of the United States
Pharmacy benefit management companies based in the United States
Retail companies established in 2007
Specialty drugs
Woonsocket, Rhode Island